Thomas Calvin Blair (born August 4, 1951) is a former American football tight end in the National Football League (NFL) who played for the Detroit Lions. He played college football at University of Tulsa.

References 

1951 births
Living people
Players of American football from Ann Arbor, Michigan
American football tight ends
Tulsa Golden Hurricane football players
Detroit Lions players